Carlos Eduardo Rovira (born February 18, 1956) is an Argentine Justicialist Party (PJ) politician, until 2007 governor of Misiones Province at the head of the Front for the Renewal of Concord.

Rovira was born in Posadas and studied chemical engineering at the National University of Misiones, later earning a postgraduate degree in chemical engineering at the University of Buenos Aires. After a period in academic research, he became an environmental consultant, focusing especially on water quality. He joined the provincial government in 1992, heading the transport department until 1995.

In 1995, Rovira was elected Mayor of Posadas. In 1999 he was elected for a first term as Governor of Misiones. Ahead of the 2003 elections he formed the Front for Renewal, bringing together Peronists and dissident Radicals to support his bid for re-election. He was re-elected in 2003. The Front for Renewal supports the national Front for Victory faction of President Néstor Kirchner.

Rovira attempted to alter the constitution of Misiones to allow his continued re-election ahead of the 2007 elections. The formation of a constitutional assembly was voted on 29 October 2006. The Rovira administration inaugurated an unusual number of public works in the month prior to the election and was alleged to have engaged in coarse proselytism, including the distribution of welfare food baskets with voting ballots inside. The opposition also alleged that thousands of Paraguayan citizens were being paid to cross the border and vote for Rovira, using forged Argentine national IDs.

Rovira's party lost the referendum to the United Front for Dignity, a broad opposition coalition led by Bishop Emeritus of Puerto Iguazú, Monsignor Joaquín Piña, by a 13% margin that surprised analysts. However, in the subsequent election for governor, Rovira was succeeded by his party's candidate, Maurice Closs.

References

External links
 Official website
 Misiones Province

1956 births
Living people
People from Posadas, Misiones
University of Buenos Aires alumni
National University of Misiones alumni
Argentine chemical engineers
Mayors of places in Argentina
Governors of Misiones Province
Members of the Chamber of Representatives of Misiones
Justicialist Party politicians